The Battle of Cherbourg, or sometimes the Battle off Cherbourg or the Sinking of CSS Alabama, was a single-ship action fought during the American Civil War between a United States Navy warship, and a Confederate States Navy warship, on June 19, 1864, off Cherbourg, France.

Background
After five successful commerce raiding missions in the Atlantic Ocean,  turned into Cherbourg Harbor on June 11, 1864. It was Captain Semmes' intention to drydock his ship and receive repairs at the French port. The Confederate Navy vessel was crewed by about 170 men and armed with six  cannon, mounted broadside, three guns per side, and two heavy pivot guns, mounted on the centerline and able to fire to either side: one ,  smoothbore gun and one ,  rifled gun. Alabama had been pursued for two years by the screw sloop-of-war , under Captain John Winslow. Kearsarge was armed with two  smoothbore Dahlgren guns which fired about 166 pounds of solid shot, four 32-pound guns and one 30-pounder Parrott rifle. She was crewed by around 150 sailors and officers.

Kearsarge had a form of makeshift armor-cladding, medium-weight chain cable triced in tiers along her port and starboard midsections, basically acting as the equivalent of chain mail for vulnerable sections of her hull, where shot could potentially penetrate and hit her boilers or steam engine. This armor protection potentially gave the Union warship a definitive advantage over the Confederate raider; however, the armor was only capable of stopping shots from Alabamas lighter 32-pound balls; either of her heavier guns could easily penetrate such lightweight protection. In the event, it was a moot point, as Alabama only managed to score two hits in this area, both of which were well above the waterline and the vulnerable engineering areas, and would have done little lasting damage even if they had successfully penetrated the hull.

On June 14, Kearsarge finally caught up with Alabama as she was receiving repairs. Kearsarge did not attack, as Alabama was in a neutral port; instead, she waited, initiating a blockade of CSS Alabama in Cherbourg. Union Captain Winslow telegraphed  to request her assistance, but the fighting began before she could arrive. Confederate Captain Semmes used the time to drill his men for the coming battle. On June 19, CSS Alabama, with nowhere else to go, ran up the Stars and Bars and exited the harbor to attack Kearsarge. She was escorted by the French Navy ironclad , whose mission was to ensure that the ensuing battle occurred outside the French harbor.

Battle

Captain Winslow spotted the departing Confederate raider, so they turned his ship around to take the impending battle out of French territorial waters. Once out, Kearsarge turned about again, hoisted the United States Navy Jack, and lined up for a broadside. Captain Winslow ordered his gunners to hold their fire until the range closed. CSS Alabama fired the first shots. They are not known to have hit. Eventually Kearsarge was under way, and the range closed to within  when she fired her first shot. The two warships maneuvered on opposite courses throughout the battle. Kearsarge and Alabama made seven spiraling circles around each other, moving southwest in a  current. Both Captain Semmes and Captain Winslow attempted to cross each other's bow, hoping to inflict heavy raking fire. The battle continued in this manner for several minutes; in the meantime, on the French coast, hundreds watched the battle. Kearsarges armor cladding sustained two hits during the engagement.

The first shell, a 32-pounder, struck within the starboard gangway. The shot cut part of the chain armor and dented the wooden planking underneath. The second shot was again a 32-pounder that exploded and broke a link of the chain. Both hits struck the chain five feet above the waterline and therefore did not threaten the boilers or machinery. The gunnery of USS Kearsarge was reportedly more accurate than that of the Confederates. She fired slowly with well-aimed shots, while Alabama fired rapidly. CSS Alabama fired a total of over 370 rounds during the fighting; it is not known how many Kearsarge fired, but it is known that she fired many fewer than the Confederates did. Eventually, after just over an hour of exchanging artillery fire, Alabama had received shot-holes beneath the waterline from Kearsarges Dahlgren guns and began to sink. Captain Semmes struck the Confederate colors, but still Kearsarge continued firing until a white flag was seen, raised by one of the Confederate sailors with his hand. The battle was over, so Captain Semmes sent his remaining dinghy to Captain Winslow, to ask for aid.

During the battle, 40 Confederate sailors were casualties (19 killed in action or drowned and 21 wounded). Another seventy or so were picked up by Kearsarge. Thirty or so were rescued by Deerhound, a British yacht, which Captain Winslow asked to help evacuate Alabamas crew, and three French pilot boats. Captain Semmes and fourteen of his officers were among the sailors rescued by Deerhound. Instead of delivering the captured Confederates to Kearsarge, Deerhound set a course for Southampton, thus enabling Captain Semmes' escape. This act severely angered Kearsarges crew, who begged their captain to allow them to open fire on the British yacht. Captain Winslow would not allow this, so the Confederates got away and avoided imprisonment. Three men were wounded aboard the United States' vessel, one of whom died the following day.

Aftermath

In art
For many years after the battle, Confederate Captain Semmes stated that he would never have chosen to test USS Kearsarge had he known of her armor-clad protection. CSS Alabama had destroyed or captured dozens of Union merchant vessels during her Atlantic cruises; when word of Alabamas sinking reached the northeastern United States, many Northerners were joyful. Édouard Manet produced two paintings of the fight, The Battle of the Kearsarge and the Alabama, now at the Philadelphia Museum of Art, and Kearsarge at Boulogne, now at the Metropolitan Museum of Art. American marine artist Xanthus Smith painted six versions of the naval battle. The most famous of these, a massive work exhibited at the 1876 Centennial Exposition, is in the collection of the Union League of Philadelphia.

The 37th album of Les Tuniques Bleues, titled Duel dans la Manche ("Duel in the Channel"), takes place during the Battle of Cherbourg, on USS Kearsarge.

The battle was commemorated in the sea shanty "Roll, Alabama, Roll".

Wreck of Alabama
Captain Max Guerout later confirmed that the wreck was that of Alabama.

In 1988, a nonprofit organisation named the CSS Alabama Association was created to conduct a scientific survey of the wreck. Although it now lies in French territorial waters, the U.S. government claimed possession of it on the grounds that Alabama had struck to Kearsarge and that the location had not been within French territorial waters at the time of the battle. On 3 October 1989, France and the United States signed an agreement recognising the wreck as a common historic heritage for both nations and established a joint scientific team for its exploration.

On 23 March 1995, the CSS Alabama Association and the Naval History & Heritage Command signed an agreement to accredit the association for the archeological survey of Alabama. In 2002, over 300 samples were recovered, including the ship's bell, guns, part of the ship's structure, furniture, and tableware. In 2004, a human jaw was found under a gun and was subsequently buried in Mobile, Alabama.

See also
 Bahia Incident
 Battle of Havana (1870)
 SS Cantabria

Gallery

Notes

References

 
 
 
 
 
 
 
 
 
 
 
 

Naval battles of the American Civil War
Union victories of the American Civil War
Maritime incidents in June 1864
Military history of the English Channel
Battle of Cherbourg
1864 in France
Battle of Cherbourg